The Corner Grocer is a 1917 American silent drama film directed by George Cowl and starring Lew Fields, Madge Evans and Lillian Cook. It was shot at the Fort Lee studios in New Jersey.

Plot summary 
Kindhearted Charles Wendel, who has built his pushcart grocery business into a prosperous enterprise, adopts little eight-year-old Mary Brian after her mother dies in poverty. The little girl becomes the angel of the house, beloved by all. Wendel's dream is that his son Ralph will carry on the business, but when Ralph graduates from college, he decides that he is too good for the grocery business. Instead, he goes to work in a bank, where he falls prey to swindlers who convince him to forge his father's name on a $100,000 check. When the forgery is discovered, the old man covers the check at the cost of his own financial ruin. Ralph, chagrined, leaves home to make good and soon after returns, prosperous, to wed Mary and restore the fortune and happiness of the Wendel family.

Cast
 Lew Fields as Charles Wendel 
 Madge Evans as Mary Brian, age 8 
 Lillian Cook as Mary Brian, age 18 
 Nick Long Jr. as Ralph Wendel, age 10 
 William Sherwood as Ralph Wendel, age 20 
 Justine Cutting as Lena Wendel 
 George Cowl as Oscar Leaming 
 Pinna Nesbit as Stella 
 Vivia Ogden as Old Maid 
 Stanhope Wheatcroft as William

References

Bibliography
 John Koegel. Music in German Immigrant Theater: New York City, 1840-1940. University Rochester Press, 2009.

External links
 

1917 films
1917 drama films
1910s English-language films
American silent feature films
Silent American drama films
Films directed by George Cowl
American black-and-white films
World Film Company films
Films shot in Fort Lee, New Jersey
1910s American films